Jack Eames (22 December 1922 – 16 January 2017) was an Australian rules footballer who played with Richmond in the Victorian Football League (VFL).

Eames was one of many present and future VFL footballers who served in World War II. He enlisted in the Australian Army in 1942 and served until he was discharged in 1946. A follower, he made himself available to VFL clubs prior to the 1946 season when he decided to move from his home in Albury, to Melbourne, for work purposes. Four clubs tried to get his signature and it was with Richmond who were successful. However, he would spend only one season at Richmond, playing 14 games. He accepted an offer to captain-coach Wodonga in 1947 and returned home to the Ovens & Murray Football League. His performances in the 1949 season won him a Morris Medal.

References

1922 births
2017 deaths
Richmond Football Club players
Wodonga Football Club players
Wodonga Football Club coaches
Australian Army personnel of World War II
Australian Army soldiers
Australian rules footballers from Albury
Military personnel from New South Wales